Marna is an unincorporated community in Faribault County, in the U.S. state of Minnesota.

History
Marna contained a post office from 1901 until 1911. The community was named after the Marne River, in France.

References

Unincorporated communities in Faribault County, Minnesota
Unincorporated communities in Minnesota